Whaw is a hamlet in Arkengarthdale in North Yorkshire, England. It is one of few settlements in the dale and is one of the smallest. Its name derives from the Old Norse of Kvi and Hagi, which means the enclosure of the sheep. The adjacent Arkle Beck Meadows form a Site of Special Scientific Interest.

The hillsides around Whaw are scarred with the remnants of lead mining and former hushes are still in evidence. During the 18th and 19th centuries, the hamlet was (and the whole of Arkengarthdale) were subject to a higher population because of the miners working in the hills. In 1840, a Wesleyan chapel was built in Whaw, this survives but no longer as a religious house.

The 1851 census counted 18 houses in Whaw. In the 2011 census, Whaw was counted in Arkengarthdale Parish as having 231 residents overall.

References

External links

Villages in North Yorkshire
Arkengarthdale